Vinet is a surname, and may refer to:

Alexandre Vinet (1797–1847), Swiss critic and theologian
Élie Vinet (1509–1587), French Renaissance humanist, classical scholar, translator and antiquary
Luc Vinet (born 1953), Canadian physicist and former rector of the Université de Montréal

See also
Vinets